The Sweetest Chant Stakes is a Grade III American Thoroughbred horse race for three year old fillies, over a distance of one and one-sixteenth miles on the turf held annually in late January or early February at Gulfstream Park, Hallandale Beach, Florida.  The event currently carries a purse of $175,000.

History 
The race was inaugurated in 1986 and was run on the dirt and named after the winning mare Sweetest Chant who won twelve races in her career including the Grade II Orchid Stakes.

The event has been run at several different distances the current distance of one mile and on the turf since 2009 after a lengthy absence of nine years.

The event was upgraded to a Grade III event in 2015.

The distance for the event was increased to  miles in 2022.

Records
Speed record: 
  miles: 1:40.91 – Capital Request (2000)
 1 mile: 1:34.20 – Premier Steps (IRE) (2013)

Margins:
 8 lengths – Natania (1986)

Most wins by a jockey
 4 – José A. Santos (1992, 1994, 1995, 1997)

Most wins by a trainer
 6 – Chad C. Brown (2012, 2013, 2014, 2015, 2016, 2017)

Most wins by an owner
 3 – Klaravich Stables & William Lawrence (2014, 2015, 2016)

Winners

Legend:

 

Notes:

See also
List of American and Canadian Graded races

References

External links
 2021–22 Gulfstream Park Media Guide

External links
Gulfstream Park

Horse races in the United States
Graded stakes races in the United States
1986 establishments in Florida
Recurring sporting events established in 1986
Horse races in Florida
Flat horse races for three-year-old fillies
Grade 3 stakes races in the United States
Mile category horse races for fillies and mares